James Henderson Ross (born 1941) is an Australian botanist.

Authority abbreviation

References

Living people
1941 births
20th-century Australian botanists